Krantiveera Sangolli Rayanna is a 1967 Indian Kannada film, directed by B. T. Athani and produced by Neminatha Gat. The film stars V. S. Patil, Kamini Kadam, Dada Salavi, and Rajashekar in lead roles. The film had a musical score by Lakshman Beralekar.

Cast

V. S. Patil
Kamini Kadam
Dada Salavi
Rajashekar
Leela Gandhi
Saroja Borakara
Thara
Shanthamma
Renukadevi
Chandrakantha
Gururaja
Kodanda Rao
Padesura Basavaraj
Srinath
Maruthi Pailwan
Sharanayya
Rama Sevekari
Sannachari
Obaleshwara
Abhi Bhattacharya in a guest appearance

Soundtrack 
The movie has 7 songs composed by Laxman Baralekar. The songs are sung by Lata Mangeshkar, Usha Mangeshkar, Asha Bhosle and Manna Dey. Mangeshkar sisters made their debut in Kannada. Lata's song "Bellane Belagayithu" was well received.

References

1960s Kannada-language films